Geomela is a genus containing several small dark beetles in the family Chrysomelidae (leaf beetles).
They are flat when compared with other leaf beetles. There are 13 species which occur mainly in the southeastern parts of Australia (Victoria, New South Wales, and eastern South Australia).

References

Beetles of Australia
Chrysomelidae genera
Chrysomelinae
Taxa named by Arthur Mills Lea